Unforgettable may refer to:

Film
 Unforgettable (1996 film), a thriller starring Ray Liotta
 Unforgettable (2014 film), a Bollywood film
 Unforgettable (2016 film), a South Korean film
 Unforgettable (2017 film), an American thriller film
 Unforgettable (2019 film), a Filipino film

TV
 The Unforgettable, a 2000–2002 and 2010–2012 British television documentary programme
 Unforgettable (American TV series), a 2011–2016 crime drama series
 Unforgettable (Philippine TV series), a 2013 romantic-fantasy series
 "Unforgettable" (Star Trek: Voyager), a 1998 episode of Star Trek: Voyager

Music

Albums 
 Unforgettable (Dinah Washington album), 1961
 Unforgettable (Fullerton College Jazz Band album), 1985
 Unforgettable (Imran Khan album), 2009
 Unforgettable (Joe Pass album), 1998
 Unforgettable (Leroy Hutson album), 1979
 Unforgettable (Merle Haggard album), 2004
 Unforgettable (Nat King Cole album), 1952
 Unforgettable (Selena album), 2005
 Unforgettable: A Tribute to Dinah Washington, by Aretha Franklin, 1964
 Unforgettable... with Love, by Natalie Cole, 1991
 Unforgettable, by Tinga Stewart, 2000

Songs 
 "Unforgettable" (French Montana song), 2017
 "Unforgettable" (Godsmack song), 2018
 "Unforgettable" (Nat King Cole song), 1951
 "Unforgettable" (Melon Kinenbi song), 2007
 "Unforgettable" (Thomas Rhett song), 2017

Other uses
 Unforgettable (novel), a 2007 It Girl novel by Cecily von Ziegesar
 Unforgettable, an annual event sponsored by KoreAm 
 The Unforgettables, four seniors on the 1991–92 Kentucky Wildcats men's basketball team

See also
 Memories (radio network) or Unforgettable Favorites